Kevin Roberts is an Antigua and Barbudan football player. He has played for Antigua and Barbuda national team.

National team statistics

References

Living people
Antigua and Barbuda footballers
Antigua and Barbuda international footballers
Association football defenders
Year of birth missing (living people)